Miranda Giambelli (born 22 May 1992) is an Australian judoka. She competed at the 2016 Summer Olympics in the women's 78 kg event, in which she was eliminated in the second round by Mayra Aguiar.

References

External links
 

1992 births
Living people
Australian female judoka
Olympic judoka of Australia
Judoka at the 2016 Summer Olympics
20th-century Australian women
21st-century Australian women